The Union for the Republic (UNIR) is the ruling political party in Togo. The party emerged from the former Rally of the Togolese People (RPT) which was dissolved in 2012.

Electoral history

Presidential Elections

National Assembly elections

References

External links

Political parties in Togo
Political parties established in 2012
2012 establishments in Togo